The 2017 Internazionali Femminili di Brescia was a professional tennis tournament played on outdoor clay courts. It was the tenth edition of the tournament and part of the 2017 ITF Women's Circuit, offering a total of $60,000 in prize money. It took place in Brescia, Italy, from 5–11 June 2017.

Point distribution

Singles main draw entrants

Seeds 

 1 Rankings as of 29 May 2017

Other entrants 
The following players received wildcards into the singles main draw:
  Stefania Rubini
  Camilla Scala
  Lucrezia Stefanini
  Beatrice Torelli

The following players received entry from the qualifying draw:
  Martina Caregaro
  Deborah Chiesa
  Priscilla Hon
  Jelena Simić

The following player received entry as a lucky loser:
  Carolina Meligeni Alves

Champions

Singles

 Polona Hercog def.  Ganna Poznikhirenko, 6–2, 7–5

Doubles

 Julia Glushko /  Priscilla Hon def.  Montserrat González /  Ilona Kremen, 2–6, 7–6(7–4), [10–8]

External links 
 2017 Internazionali Femminili di Brescia at ITFtennis.com
 Official website

2017 in Italian tennis
2017 ITF Women's Circuit
2017
2017